Zenonia is a genus of skipper butterflies in the family Hesperiidae.

It is native to Africa.

Species
Zenonia anax Evans, 1937
Zenonia crasta Evans, 1937
Zenonia zeno (Trimen, 1864)

External links
Funet: Zenonia index

Hesperiinae
Butterflies of Africa
Hesperiidae genera